Metal Evolution is a 2011 documentary series directed by anthropologist and filmmaker Sam Dunn and director, producer and music supervisor Scot McFadyen about heavy metal subgenres, with new episodes airing every Friday at 10 pm EST on MuchMore and Saturday at 10pm EST on VH1 Classic. Its origins come from Dunn's first documentary Metal: A Headbanger's Journey, which included the acclaimed "Heavy Metal Family Tree."

Summary
Metal Evolution is broken down into episodes about a different piece of metal history. The series includes interviews with and about Alice Cooper, Slash, Lemmy, Rob Zombie, members of Megadeth, Metallica, Iron Maiden, Black Sabbath, Deep Purple, Slayer, Judas Priest, Van Halen, Whitesnake, Def Leppard, The Stooges, ZZ Top, Soundgarden, Mötley Crüe, Poison, Rage Against the Machine, Alice in Chains, Korn, Slipknot, Lamb of God and more.

History
The series was created after feedback about Metal: A Headbanger's Journey debuted. "Some people said they wished that film was eight hours long," Dunn said. The "Heavy Metal Family Tree" from the documentary heavily influenced the Metal Evolution series, with the Banger Films official blog noting that using the 26-subgenre chart as a "road map, host/producer and metalhead turned anthropologist Sam Dunn, crisscrossed the globe exploring the vast history of heavy metal across its 40+ year history and beyond."

Episodes

Heavy Metal Family Tree
For Metal Evolution, Sam Dunn presented a new, updated version of his "Heavy Metal Family Tree," a 26-subgenre chart that mapped out metal's various subgenres that have spawned over the course of its 40-year history. This new, more elaborate version included a "Pre-History of Metal" field that listed non-metal musicians that had an influence on heavy metal. It also listed additional bands as examples of the various styles of metal. Some (but not all) of the subgenres were shown over the course of the series.

Pre-History of Metal
Niccolò Paganini; Richard Wagner; Gustav Holst; Howlin' Wolf; Robert Johnson; Buddy Rich; Elvis Presley; Little Richard; The Beatles; The Kinks; The Who; Cream; Jimi Hendrix

Progressive Rock
Jethro Tull; King Crimson; Emerson, Lake & Palmer; Yes; Genesis; Uriah Heep; Mahavishnu Orchestra; Journey; Styx; Kansas

Early Metal US 
Dick Dale; Vanilla Fudge; Steppenwolf; Iron Butterfly; Blue Cheer; MC5; The Stooges; Alice Cooper; ZZ Top; Blue Öyster Cult; Aerosmith; Montrose; Kiss; Ted Nugent; Y&T; Van Halen

Early Metal UK
Deep Purple; Led Zeppelin; Black Sabbath; Budgie; The Sweet; Slade; Status Quo; Nazareth; Thin Lizzy; Queen; Judas Priest; AC/DC; Rainbow; Whitesnake

Shock Rock
Screamin' Jay Hawkins; Arthur Brown; Alice Cooper; New York Dolls; Kiss; Ozzy Osbourne; Venom; W.A.S.P.; King Diamond; Gwar; Marilyn Manson; Slipknot; Rammstein

Original Punk
Ramones; The Damned; Sex Pistols; The Clash; The Vibrators; The Saints; Dead Boys

Progressive Metal
Rush; Savatage; Queensrÿche; Fates Warning; Voivod; Dream Theater; Meshuggah; Porcupine Tree; Tool; Symphony X; Opeth; Gojira; Mastodon; Coheed and Cambria

Power Metal
Scorpions; Accept; Manowar; Dio; Yngwie Malmsteen; Helloween; Blind Guardian; Stratovarius; Iced Earth; Kamelot; HammerFall; Rhapsody of Fire; Nightwish; Primal Fear; Sonata Arctica; DragonForce

New Wave of British Heavy Metal
Motörhead; Def Leppard; Quartz; Saxon; Iron Maiden; Tygers of Pan Tang; Diamond Head; Angel Witch; Girlschool; Raven; Fist; Holocaust; Tank

Hardcore
D.O.A.; Dead Kennedys; Discharge; Black Flag; Circle Jerks; The Exploited; Minor Threat; GBH; Misfits; Bad Brains; Agnostic Front

Doom Metal
Witchfinder General; Trouble; Candlemass; Solitude Aeturnus; Sleep; Cathedral; Saint Vitus; Pentagram ; Electric Wizard

Glam Metal
Quiet Riot; Mötley Crüe; Twisted Sister; Europe; Dokken; Ratt; Bon Jovi; Cinderella; Poison; Guns N' Roses; Winger; Warrant

Grunge
Green River; Screaming Trees; Melvins; Skin Yard; Soundgarden; Mudhoney; Tad; Nirvana; Alice in Chains; Mother Love Bone; Pearl Jam

Thrash Metal
Anvil; Metallica; Slayer; Anthrax; Megadeth; Pantera; Exodus; Overkill; Kreator; Destruction; Sodom; Sepultura; Testament; Death Angel

First Wave of Black Metal
Venom; Mercyful Fate; Bathory; Hellhammer; Celtic Frost

Industrial Metal
Ministry; White Zombie; Godflesh; Nine Inch Nails; Fear Factory; Genitorturers; Strapping Young Lad; Orgy; Static-X; Rammstein

Hard Alternative
Faith No More; Red Hot Chili Peppers; Jane's Addiction; Prong; Living Colour; The Smashing Pumpkins; Primus; Rage Against the Machine

Post-Grunge
Stone Temple Pilots; Candlebox; Bush; Silverchair; Nickelback; Creed; Godsmack

Metalcore
Corrosion of Conformity; Dirty Rotten Imbeciles; Suicidal Tendencies; Stormtroopers of Death; Cro-Mags; Biohazard; Machine Head; Earth Crisis; Hatebreed

Death Metal
Possessed; Death; Autopsy; Morbid Angel; Obituary; Cannibal Corpse; Deicide; Immolation; Vader; Six Feet Under; Kataklysm; Dying Fetus; Nile; Amon Amarth

Grindcore
Repulsion; Extreme Noise Terror; Napalm Death; Carcass; Bolt Thrower; Brutal Truth; Nasum; Cephalic Carnage; Agoraphobic Nosebleed; Pig Destroyer

Black Metal
Mayhem; Darkthrone; Marduk; Satyricon; Enslaved; Gorgoroth; Emperor; Dimmu Borgir; Cradle of Filth; Dark Funeral

Goth Metal
Tiamat; Type O Negative; Therion; The Gathering; Anathema; Katatonia; Theatre of Tragedy; Within Temptation; HIM; Lacuna Coil; Leaves' Eyes

Nu Metal
Korn; Deftones; Stuck Mojo; Limp Bizkit; Papa Roach; Coal Chamber; System of a Down; Kittie; Linkin Park; Disturbed

New Wave of American Metal
Shadows Fall; Lamb of God; God Forbid; Darkest Hour; Killswitch Engage; Unearth; Chimaira; The Black Dahlia Murder; As I Lay Dying; Trivium

Swedish Extreme Metal
Entombed; Grave; Unleashed; Dismember; At the Gates; Dark Tranquillity; In Flames; Arch Enemy; Soilwork; The Haunted

References

External links
Banger Films official website
Metal Evolution VH1 official website 

Documentary television series about music
VH1 original programming
Documentary films about heavy metal music and musicians
Heavy metal television series
English-language television shows
2010s Canadian music television series
2011 Canadian television series debuts
2010s Canadian documentary television series
MuchMoreMusic original programming